John Simon Bercow (born 19 January 1963) is a British former politician who was Speaker of the House of Commons from 2009 to 2019, and Member of Parliament (MP) for Buckingham between 1997 and 2019. A member of the Conservative Party prior to becoming Speaker, he was the first MP since Selwyn Lloyd in 1971 to be elected Speaker without having been a Deputy Speaker. After resigning as Speaker in 2019 and opting not to seek re-election as MP for Buckingham in the 2019 general election, Bercow left Parliament. In 2021, he joined the Labour Party but was suspended in 2022.

Bercow was a councillor in the London Borough of Lambeth from 1986 to 1990 and unsuccessfully contested Parliamentary seats in the 1987 and 1992 general elections, before being elected for Buckingham in 1997. Promoted to the Shadow Cabinet in 2001, he held posts under Iain Duncan Smith and Michael Howard. In November 2002, Bercow resigned over a dispute concerning his support for the Adoption and Children Act 2002, but returned a year later, only to be dismissed from the Shadow Cabinet in 2004. Having initially been strongly associated with the right-wing faction of his party, his views shifted; by 2009, there were rumours that he would defect to the Labour Party.

On the resignation of Michael Martin in June 2009, Bercow stood successfully in the election to replace him as Speaker. As Speaker, he was obliged to leave the Conservative Party and remain as an independent for the duration of his tenure. He was re-elected unopposed at the commencements of the Parliaments in 2010, 2015 and 2017. This made him the first Speaker since the Second World War to have been elected four times, as well as the first since then to have served alongside four Prime Ministers. In September 2019, Bercow declared that he would stand down as Commons Speaker and MP on 31 October; he remained Speaker until being appointed to the Manor of Northstead on 4 November 2019.

In 2014, Bercow was appointed Chancellor of the University of Bedfordshire. In July 2017, he was appointed Chancellor of the University of Essex, stepping down from this role in November 2021. In January 2020, he became part-time professor of politics at Royal Holloway, University of London.

In 2022, an independent Commons complaints body found Bercow to have persistently bullied staff, sworn at them over the course of more than a decade, and at one time made an undisclosed discriminatory remark. The body concluded that it would have recommended Bercow's expulsion had he still been an MP, and that he should never be permitted a pass to the Parliamentary estate. The Labour Party subsequently suspended him.

As of 2023, he is the only living former Speaker of the House of Commons.

Early life and education 
Bercow was born in Edgware, Middlesex, the son of Brenda (Bailey) and Charles Bercow, a taxi driver. His father was born to a Jewish family and his mother converted to Judaism. His paternal grandparents were Jews who arrived in Britain from Romania in the early 20th century. Having settled in the UK, the family anglicised its surname from Berkowitz to Bercow. Bercow attended Frith Manor Primary School in Woodside Park, and Finchley Manorhill, a large comprehensive school in North Finchley. In his youth, Bercow had been a successful junior tennis player, but was too short to go professional. In 1975 he appeared on the UK children's television series Crackerjack!.

Bercow graduated with a first-class honours degree in Government from the University of Essex in 1985. Anthony King, a professor at the university, has said about Bercow that "When he was a student here, he was very right-wing, pretty stroppy, and very good. He was an outstanding student." As a young activist, Bercow was a member of the right-wing Conservative Monday Club. He stood as a candidate for the club's national executive in 1981 with a manifesto calling for a programme of "assisted repatriation" of immigrants, and became secretary of its immigration and repatriation committee. However, at the age of 20 he left the club, citing the views of many of the club's members as his reason, and has since then called his participation in the club "utter madness" and dismissed his views from that period as "bone headed".

After graduating from the University of Essex, Bercow was elected as the last national chairman of the Federation of Conservative Students (FCS), 1986–87. The FCS was then broken up by the chairman of the Conservative Party, Norman Tebbit, after one of its members had accused previous Tory PM Harold Macmillan of war crimes in extraditing Cossacks to the Soviet Union. Bercow attracted the attention of the Conservative leadership, and in 1987 he was appointed by Tebbit as vice-chairman of the Conservative Collegiate Forum (the successor organisation of the FCS) to head the campaign for student support in the run-up to the 1987 general election.

After a spell in merchant banking, Bercow joined the lobbying firm Rowland Sallingbury Casey (part of Saatchi & Saatchi) in 1988, becoming a board director within five years. With fellow Conservative Julian Lewis, Bercow ran an advanced speaking and campaigning course for over 10 years, which trained over 600 Conservatives (including several current MPs) in campaigning and communication techniques. He has also lectured in the United States to students of the Leadership Institute.

Political career

Councillor 
In 1986, Bercow was elected as a Conservative councillor in the London Borough of Lambeth, and served for four years representing the Streatham, St Leonard's ward. In 1987, he was appointed the youngest deputy group leader in the United Kingdom.

Special adviser 
In 1995, Bercow was appointed as a special adviser to the Chief Secretary to the Treasury, Jonathan Aitken. After Aitken's resignation to fight a libel action, Bercow served as a special adviser to the Secretary of State for National Heritage, Virginia Bottomley.

Parliamentary career 

Bercow was an unsuccessful Conservative candidate in the 1987 general election in Motherwell South, and again at the 1992 general election in Bristol South. In 1996 he paid £1,000 to charter a helicopter so that he could attend the selection meetings for two safe Conservative parliamentary seats on the same day – Buckingham and Surrey Heath – and was selected as the candidate for Buckingham. He has referred to the hiring of the helicopter as "the best £1,000 I have ever spent".

Bercow was first elected to parliament in the 1997 general election as the MP for Buckingham with a majority of 12,386. He then increased his majority at the 2001 general election being elected by a margin of 13,325 votes. He was re-elected at the 2005 general election with an again increased majority of 18,129.

Bercow devoted a notable portion of his maiden speech to praising former Prime Minister Margaret Thatcher whom he called "the world's greatest living statesman." In 1999, the Almanac of British Politics described him as an "articulate, abrasive and waspish Commons performer" who Tony Blair had labelled as "nasty and ineffectual in equal quantity" for an attack he had made on Robin Cook.

Bercow rose quickly through the opposition's junior offices. He was appointed a frontbench spokesman for Education and Employment in June 1999, and then a frontbench spokesman for Home Affairs in July 2000, before being brought into the shadow cabinet in 2001 by the Conservative leader Iain Duncan Smith. He served as Shadow Chief Secretary to the Treasury from September 2001 to July 2002, and as Shadow Minister for Work and Pensions from July to November 2002. During this first spell on the front benches, Bercow publicly said that he did not think he was ruthless enough to reach the top of politics. In November 2002, when the Labour government introduced the Adoption and Children Act, which would allow unmarried gay and heterosexual couples to adopt children, Duncan Smith imposed a three-line whip requiring Conservative MPs to vote against the bill, rather than allowing a free vote. Arguing that it should be a free vote, Bercow defied the whips and voted with Labour, then resigned from the front bench. As a backbencher he was openly critical of Duncan Smith's leadership.

In November 2003, the new Conservative leader Michael Howard appointed Bercow as Shadow Secretary of State for International Development. However, he went on to clash with Howard over taxes, immigration and Iraq, and was sacked from the front bench in September 2004 after telling Howard that Ann Widdecombe was right to have said that there was "something of the night about him". Bercow has a long-standing interest in Burma and frequently raised issues of democracy and genocide in the country. In 2006, he was a patron of the Tory Reform Group. In 2001, he supported the ban on MPs becoming members of the Monday Club.

Bercow was formerly the treasurer of the All-Party Parliamentary Group for Tribal Peoples, an APPG composed of over 30 cross-party MPs which aims to raise parliamentary and public awareness of tribal peoples.

Bercow won the Stonewall award for Politician of the Year in 2010 for his work to support equality for lesbian, gay and bisexual people. Stonewall gave him a score of 100% for always voting for its position on gay equality issues in parliament between 2007 and 2009.

Opposition MP of the Year 
In 2005, Bercow won the Channel Four/Hansard Society Political Award for 'Opposition MP of the Year'. He said:
In addition to pursuing a wide variety of local issues, I have attempted to question, probe and scrutinise the Government in the House of Commons on important national and international topics which concern people. Over the last 12 months, I have constantly pressed the case for reform of world trade rules to give the poorest people on the planet a chance to sell their products and improve their quality of life. The plight of the people of Darfur, Western Sudan, has also been a regular theme. They have suffered too much for too long with too little done about the situation. I shall go on arguing for Britain to take the lead in the international community in seeking decisive action for peace and justice.

Rumours of defection 
Following the defection of Conservative MP Quentin Davies to the Labour Party in June 2007, there were persistent rumours that Bercow was likely to be the next Conservative MP to leave the party.

Bercow did not at that time defect to Labour, but in September 2007, accepted an advisory post on Gordon Brown's government's review of support for children with speech, language and communication special needs. The Conservative Party chairman, Caroline Spelman, confirmed that this appointment was with the consent of the Conservative Party. Bercow had a long-term interest in this topic, as his son Oliver has been diagnosed with autism.

Bercow review 
In 2008, Bercow was asked by Labour cabinet members Ed Balls and Alan Johnson to produce a substantial review of children and families affected by speech, language and communication needs (SLCN). After the report, the government pledged £52 million to raise the profile of SLCN within the education field. The review looks at the extreme consequences to which communication problems can lead; from initial frustration at not being able to express oneself, to bullying or being bullied at school, fewer job prospects and even a descent into criminality.

The interim report highlighted a number of core issues: that speech, language and communication are not only essential life skills but fundamental human rights; that early identification of problems and intervention is important to avoid social problems later on; and that the current system of treatment was patchy, i.e. there was a need for services to be continually provided for children and families from an early age.

Role in expenses scandal 

During the 2009 expenses scandal, it was revealed that Bercow changed the designation of his second home on more than one occasion – meaning that he avoided paying capital gains tax on the sale of two properties. He also claimed just under £1,000 to hire an accountant to fill in his tax returns. Bercow denied any wrongdoing, but agreed to pay £6,508 plus VAT to cover any tax that he may have had to pay to HM Revenue and Customs.

It was revealed in 2014 that the House of Commons authorities had destroyed all evidence of MPs' expenses claims prior to 2010. Bercow faced accusations that he had presided over what had been dubbed a "fresh cover-up" of the expenses scandal.

In July 2015, Bercow was again criticised for the amount of his expenses, including a claim of £172 for a  chauffeur-driven journey. Andy Silvester, campaign director at the TaxPayers' Alliance, said: "This is an obscene waste of money and shows appalling judgment from whoever made the arrangements."

Charitable work 
Bercow has supported a number of charities. He has been a Patron of the ME Association, Brain Tumour Research and a Patron of the Patchwork Foundation founded by Harris Bokhari. He also spoken at a fundraising event for the mental health charity Jami. In 2018, Bercow supported a fundraiser for Children in Need.

Speaker of the House of Commons

Election and first term 

Bercow had long campaigned quietly to become Speaker and was touted as a successor to Michael Martin. On 20 May 2009, he officially declared to stand in the Speakership election, which had been triggered by Martin's resignation, and launched his manifesto for the job. In reference to his decision to stand, Bercow said: "I wanted it because I felt that there was a task to be undertaken and that's about strengthening backbench involvement and opportunity in parliament, and helping parliament get off its knees and recognise that it isn't just there as a rubber-stamping operation for the government of the day, and as necessary and appropriate to contradict and expose the government of the day."

In the first round of the election on 22 June, Bercow received 179 votes – more than any other candidate, but short of the majority required for victory. In the third and final round of voting later that day, he defeated George Young by 322 votes to 271, and was approved by the Queen at 10 pm that night as the 157th Speaker. In accordance with convention, he rescinded his Conservative party membership.

Bercow was elected by a large number of Labour votes, many MPs being driven by the perception that Michael Martin had been hounded out of the job and wanting his replacement to be someone who was not a Conservative Party favourite.

Bercow was the first Speaker to be Jewish, the first one to have been elected by an exhaustive ballot, and the first not to wear traditional court robes while presiding over the House of Commons. However, in accordance with tradition, Bercow did display his coat of arms at Speaker's House.

Speaker's residence refurbishment 
Within weeks of taking office as Speaker, Bercow ordered a redecoration and refurbishment of the Speaker's grace and favour apartment in the Palace of Westminster, partly with the objective of making it child-friendly; the work cost £20,659 and was paid for by Parliament. It followed extensive work on the apartment under the previous Speaker.

Youth Parliament 
In October 2009, Bercow chaired the United Kingdom Youth Parliament's first annual sitting in the House of Commons, making them the only group except members of parliament to sit in the chamber. He chaired every subsequent sitting and attended every annual conference until his resignation in 2019, addressing and supporting Members of Youth Parliament from across the UK.

2010 general election and second term 
The Speaker of the House of Commons is traditionally seen as outside party politics, and is often not challenged by the main parties at general elections, including the 2010 general election. In September 2009, Nigel Farage resigned his leadership of the UK Independence Party (UKIP) to stand for Bercow's Buckingham seat, asserting, "This man represents all that is wrong with British politics today. He was embroiled in the expenses saga and he presides over a Parliament that virtually does nothing." John Stevens, another candidate, found support for his campaign from the former Independent MP Martin Bell. Bercow also faced opposition from the British National Party and the Christian Party.

As Bercow lacked a party endorsement and therefore a campaign team, he sought to build one. A group of his supporters known as 'Friends of Speaker Bercow' solicited donations for the campaign, aiming to raise £40,000. When one of their letters was received by a member of UKIP, the recipient referred it to the Parliamentary Commissioner for Standards, complaining that it appeared that Bercow's fundraising campaign was operating from the Speaker's Office, which is required to remain politically neutral. The Commissioner declined to launch an investigation because of the lack of evidence.

Speaker's Lectures 
To mark the centenary of the Parliament Act 1911, Bercow commissioned a series of lectures about the main political figures of the century. The Speaker's Lectures continue with a variety of topics such as historic parliamentarians and current affairs.

2015 general election and third term 
Bercow was returned as an MP in the 2015 general election. The election was notable for the 1,289 spoilt ballot papers, an issue he addressed in his victory speech.

On 26 March 2015, the House of Commons defeated a government motion (introduced by former Conservative party leader and then leader of the House of Commons William Hague) to require there to be a secret ballot vote on whether Bercow remain speaker after the 2015 general election. A number of MPs described it as an underhand plot to oust Bercow, largely based on the timing of the motion just before the dissolution of Parliament, when some Labour MPs expected to oppose it had already returned to their constituencies. In the event, Bercow was re-elected unopposed as Speaker following the general election.

In February 2017, Bercow said he had supported continued membership of the European Union in the 2016 referendum.

On 6 February 2017, Bercow said in the house that he would be "strongly opposed" to US President Donald Trump addressing the Houses of Parliament during his planned state visit to the UK, and told MPs that "opposition to racism and sexism" were "hugely important considerations". The comments proved controversial and made the headlines in many UK newspapers the following day, with some such as Guardian columnist Owen Jones, Labour leader Jeremy Corbyn, Labour MP Dennis Skinner and Liberal Democrat leader Tim Farron supporting this intervention. His comments were criticised by some opponents of Trump, such as Conservative MP Nadhim Zahawi), for being hypocritical and undermining the Speaker's neutrality, and some in the government reportedly felt that Bercow had overstepped his role. John Whittingdale, the Conservative MP for Maldon and a former Culture Secretary, dismissed Bercow's remarks as "playing to the gallery for as much publicity as possible", and Bercow himself apologised to the Lord Speaker Lord Fowler over a lack of consultation over his remarks.

2017 general election and fourth term 
Following the 2017 general election, Bercow was re-elected unopposed as Speaker of the House by members of parliament on 13 June 2017.

Brexit 
In January 2019, Bercow broke with convention, allowing a vote on an amendment to a government business motion. The amendment, tabled by Dominic Grieve MP, required the Prime Minister (Theresa May) to table a motion within three days on proposed alternative plans if her Brexit deal was rejected by Parliament.

On 18 March 2019, Bercow, in a statement to the House, pre-empted a move by the Government to bring the UK/EU Withdrawal Agreement for a third vote. Citing a convention which dates back to 1604, Bercow stated that he would not allow a vote on a motion which was "substantially the same" as a previously rejected motion.

Retirement as Speaker and career after parliament

Having served 10 years as Speaker, Bercow became the longest-serving Speaker since Edward FitzRoy, who served nearly 15 years in post between 1928 and 1943.

In October 2018, it was reported that Bercow intended to step down as Speaker in the summer of 2019, but in January 2019 it was reported that he planned to stay as Speaker until the end of the parliament, in 2022. On 9 September 2019, amid debates about Brexit and parliament being prorogued, Bercow declared to the House of Commons that he would stand down on 31 October, or at the next general election, whichever was sooner; the former applied.

Despite the convention that former Speakers of the House of Commons are elevated to membership of the House of Lords when they resign, the Prime Minister denied Bercow a peerage because it was perceived that he had not maintained political neutrality in office and would not be politically neutral in the House of Lords as convention requires Sources in the Cabinet had suggested beforehand that this would be due to his rulings during the Parliamentary votes on Brexit, which the Government saw as biased against them. Bercow became the first ex-Speaker since the retirement of Arthur Onslow in 1761 to have been eligible for, but not have been made the offer of, a peerage. Overall, he is the tenth Speaker not to receive a Peerage since the 1707 Act of Union, and the fifth since Onslow's retirement not to be immediately elevated to the House of Lords: Charles Wolfran Cornwall died in office with no peerage offer to his surviving family, John Henry Whitley was offered but declined, and following the deaths of Edward Fitzroy and Sir Harry Hylton-Foster in office, their widows were ennobled instead. With no prospect of a government-sponsored peerage, Bercow lobbied the Labour leader, Jeremy Corbyn, in the hope that the opposition might give him preferment.

In November 2019, Bercow was appointed by Chancellor of the Exchequer Sajid Javid as Steward and Bailiff of the Manor of Northstead; since members of the House of Commons are prohibited from resigning, the legal device of appointment to an "office of profit under The Crown" is used to permit members to leave their legislative offices.

In the same month, Bercow stated that he "think[s] that Brexit is the biggest foreign policy mistake in the post-war period, and that is my honest view." This led to further questions about Bercow's impartiality during the Brexit parliamentary debates. He maintained that he was impartial during the debates, and only made his views clear after leaving office.

His autobiography, Unspeakable, was published in 2020. In his memoirs, he was highly critical of David Cameron, Theresa May, Boris Johnson and Andrea Leadsom. Bercow has since identified himself as a soft leftist and declared that he voted for Sadiq Khan to be Mayor of London. He was also nominated for a peerage by Labour leader Jeremy Corbyn, but this was refused by Prime Minister Boris Johnson. Bercow has also been very critical of the Conservative government's handling of COVID-19 since leaving Parliament.

On 19 June 2021, Bercow said that he had joined the Labour Party "a few weeks ago". He said Boris Johnson's Conservative Party was "reactionary, populist, nationalistic and sometimes even xenophobic." He said his move to Labour was motivated by his "support for equality, social justice and internationalism. That is the Labour brand."

It was revealed that Bercow broke the pledge he made in 2012 not to take his speaker's pension until he is 65 years old. While Bercow originally "proposed before he leaves office to waive his entitlement to the Speaker's pension until he reaches the age of 65", in 2021 he revealed he started taking the pension when he left the office, after speaking with his wife.

Bullying of office staff 
In May 2018, Bercow's former private secretary Angus Sinclair alleged on the BBC's Newsnight programme that Bercow had repeatedly bullied him while at work. Sinclair said that he was told to sign a non-disclosure agreement when he left his post, to prevent him revealing Bercow's bullying. Bercow denied the claims. Sinclair's allegations came not long after the BBC reported that his successor as Bercow's private secretary, Kate Emms, had been signed off work and then moved to another role. Unnamed colleagues of Emms had told the BBC's Newsnight programme that her sickness and change of role were because of bullying by Bercow.

In October 2018, Bercow had called for an independent body to be set up to investigate allegations of harassment and bullying in Parliament. He faced calls to quit after an independent report by Dame Laura Cox found that harassment and bullying had been tolerated and concealed for years, which Bercow denies. On 23 October 2018, three Conservative MPs, Will Quince, Mims Davies and Anne Milton, resigned from the Commons Reference Group on Representation and Inclusion, which is chaired by Bercow, and cited Bercow's handling of bullying and sexual harassment allegations in Parliament as the reason for doing so.

In January 2020, Lord Lisvane, who served as Clerk of the House of Commons under Bercow, submitted a formal complaint to the Parliamentary Commissioner for Standards. In the same month Lisvane's complaint was followed up by a further accusation of bullying, made by the former Black Rod, Lieutenant-General David Leakey.

In January 2022, the Parliamentary Commissioner for Standards, Kathryn Stone, upheld 21 allegations out of 35 brought by Lord Lisvane and private secretaries Kate Emms and Angus Sinclair against Bercow, who appealed to the Independent Expert Panel.

In March 2022, the Independent Expert Panel upheld the findings of the Parliamentary Commissioner for Standards, concluding that Bercow had “been widely unreliable and repeatedly dishonest in his evidence", a "serial liar" and a "serial bully". Formally reprimanding Bercow, the Panel recommended that, as he was no longer a Member of Parliament and could not, therefore, be expelled from the House of Commons, “he should never be permitted a pass to the Parliamentary estate". The Labour Party subsequently suspended him from the party. Bercow rejected the Panel's findings and declared the body⁠—which included a former Lord Justice of Appeal and a former Chief Coroner⁠—to be a "kangaroo court" lacking in legal expertise. Lisvane dismissed Bercow's rejection as "hysterical petulance from someone caught bang to rights".

Personal life
Bercow married Sally Illman in 2002 after 13 years of an "on-off" relationship, and they have three children. Their elder son, Oliver, is autistic. Sally had an affair with Bercow's cousin in 2015 but Sally later returned to the marriage; Bercow said he bore some responsibility for the affair by not providing enough time for his wife. His wife, who used to be a Conservative, switched to supporting the Labour Party, campaigning for both her husband individually and Labour in the wider election in 1997. Bercow and those close to him reject the view that she was especially influential in changing his political views. Both he and his wife are teetotallers.

Bercow is a humanist, and before taking the role of Speaker was a member of the All-Party Parliamentary Humanist Group. When discussing the role of clergy in Parliament, he described himself in a Commons debate as "an irreligious person taking a secular interest in an important subject".

Bercow has been a fan of Arsenal F.C. since January 1971 and is a season ticket holder. He always attends games with his son, and has appeared on AFTV. Bercow is also a lifelong follower of tennis, having played competitively against the likes of Andrew Castle and Jeremy Bates in his youth. His book on the sport, Tennis Maestros: The Twenty Greatest Male Tennis Players of All Time, was published in 2014 by Biteback Publishing.

Bercow is a director and shareholder of Fedhead Limited. His wife owns 24 percent of the company.

In January 2022, Bercow was a contestant on the eleventh episode of the revival of the BBC quiz show The Weakest Link where he was voted out in round 2.

Books

Arms

Honours

Scholastic
 University degrees

 Chancellor, visitor, governor, rector and fellowships

Honorary degrees

Freedom of the City

References

Further reading 
 Bobby Friedman. Bercow, Mr Speaker: Rowdy Living in the Tory Party (2011) Gibson Square.

External links 

 
 Debrett's People of Today
 The Speaker official Parliament website
 
 APPG for Tribal Peoples – Official website
 

|-

|-

1963 births
Alumni of the University of Essex
Conservative Party (UK) councillors
Conservative Party (UK) MPs for English constituencies
Labour Party (UK) people
Councillors in the London Borough of Lambeth
British special advisers
Secular humanists
English humanists
English people of Romanian-Jewish descent
English autobiographers
Jewish British politicians
Jewish humanists
Living people
Members of the Privy Council of the United Kingdom
People from Edgware
Speakers of the House of Commons of the United Kingdom
UK MPs 1997–2001
UK MPs 2001–2005
UK MPs 2005–2010
UK MPs 2010–2015
UK MPs 2015–2017
UK MPs 2017–2019
Academics of Royal Holloway, University of London
Scottish Conservative Party parliamentary candidates
Chancellors of the University of Essex
People associated with the University of Bedfordshire
People associated with Birkbeck, University of London
People associated with the University of Manchester
People associated with City, University of London
People associated with De Montfort University
People associated with the University of Buckingham